"Guitar Talk" is a single by Canadian country music artist Michelle Wright. Released in 1993, it was the sixth single from her album Now and Then. The song reached #1 on the RPM Country Tracks chart in January 1994.

Chart performance

Year-end charts

References

1993 singles
Michelle Wright songs
Arista Nashville singles
Songs written by Steve Bogard
1992 songs